The Jami al-Qarafa Mosque or Qarafa Mosque, was the second major mosque built by the Fatimid dynasty in their new capital of Cairo after their conquest of Egypt in 969. It was located in the Qarafa, the great necropolis of Cairo and Fustat.

The mosque was built in 976 by order of Al-Sayyida al-Mu'iziyya (also known as Durzan), mother of the Caliph al-'Aziz (r. 975–996), and her daughter Sitt al-Malik.
It occupied the site of the older mosque of the Dome (Masjid al-Qubba), and apparently was very large.
The historian al-Maqrizi says it was one of the most beautiful buildings of its day.
A possible layout was described by Jonathan Bloom in his "The Mosque of the Qarafa", although Yūsuf Rāghib pointed out problems with this reconstruction in his "La mosquée d'al-Qarāfa."
In Bloom's opinion, the mosque had a central aisle, wider than the others and with a higher roof, that led a dome over the spaces before the mihrab.
This was similar to the mosques of al-Azhar and al-Hākim bi-Amr Allāh.

The courtyard provided a place where the elite of Cairo would meet on Friday evenings in summer,
and the covered qibla part of the mosque gave them a meeting place in the cooler weather.
State festivals would be held at the mosque in which food was distributed to all classes of people.
According to Ibn al-Zayyāt, it was an especially holy mosque, one where people would seek refuge in times of trouble.
When a great fire burned down most of al-Fustat in 1168 the mosque was almost completed destroyed, with only its green mihrab being preserved.
It was later rebuilt as the Jami' al-Awliyya, but was little used after al-Qarafa became depopulated following a crisis in 1403.

Notes and references 
Notes

Citations

Sources

Mosques in Cairo
Fatimid architecture in Cairo
Mosques completed in the 970s
Former mosques